Lost Creek is a tributary of the south fork of Little Butte Creek in Jackson County in the U.S. state of Oregon. The only named tributary of Lost Creek is Coon Creek, which enters from the left.

Lost Creek Bridge, a covered bridge, carries Lost Creek Road over the creek but is closed to vehicular traffic. The  structure is the shortest covered bridge in Oregon.  It was added to the National Register of Historic Places in 1979.

See also
List of rivers of Oregon

References

Rivers of Jackson County, Oregon
Rivers of Oregon